Brian Joseph Mennes (born April 26, 1966) is a United States Army major general who serves as the deputy commanding general of the  XVIII Airborne Corps since August 2021. He previously served as commanding general of the 10th Mountain Division and Fort Drum from May 1, 2019 to July 12, 2021, and as director of force management of the United States Army.

Born in New Mexico, Mennes graduated from the United States Military Academy with a B.S. degree in mechanical engineering in May 1988. He later earned a Master of Military Art and Science degree from the Army Command and General Staff College.

In June 2021, Mennes was nominated for promotion to lieutenant general. Pending confirmation, Mennes was assigned as deputy commanding general of the XVIII Airborne Corps, replacing the nomination previously filled by Xavier T. Brunson, who become deputy commanding general of I Corps instead. On September 20, 2021, Mennes' nomination and recommendation for promotion were withdrawn.

References

1966 births
Living people
United States Military Academy alumni
Military personnel from New Mexico
United States Army Rangers
United States Army personnel of the War in Afghanistan (2001–2021)
United States Army Command and General Staff College alumni
Recipients of the Legion of Merit
United States Army generals
Recipients of the Defense Superior Service Medal
Recipients of the Distinguished Service Medal (US Army)